Niall Logue (born 7 August 1995) is a Northern Irish football player who currently plays for Hartford Athletic in the USL Championship.

Playing career

Youth & United States
Logue played for four years at Institute. Logue then moved to the United States in 2014 to play college soccer at Yavapai College in Arizona, where he played for two years before transferring to Ohio State University.

Derry City & Finn Harps
On 21 February 2018, Logue joined League of Ireland Premier Division side Derry City. He spent part of the 2018 season on loan to Finn Harps before joining them permanently ahead of their 2019 season.

FC Tucson
Logue returned to the United States in 2020 to join USL League One side FC Tucson.

El Paso Locomotive
On 10 December 2020, it was announced that Logue would join USL Championship side El Paso Locomotive ahead of their 2021 season.

Loan to Memphis 901
On 30 June 2021, Logue moved on loan to USL Championship side Memphis 901 for the rest of the 2021 season.

Permanent move to Memphis 901
On 7 January 2022, Logue signed on a permanent deal with Memphis 901.

Hartford Athletic
It was announced on 16 December 2022 that Logue would join USL Championship side Hartford Athletic for the 2023 season.

References 

1995 births
Living people
Association footballers from Northern Ireland
Sportspeople from Derry (city)
Association football defenders
Yavapai Roughriders men's soccer players
Ohio State Buckeyes men's soccer players
Derry City F.C. players
Finn Harps F.C. players
FC Tucson players
El Paso Locomotive FC players
Memphis 901 FC players
Hartford Athletic players
League of Ireland players
USL League One players
USL Championship players
Expatriate soccer players in the United States